Giovanni Evangelista Pelleo, O.F.M. Conv. (died 1595) was a Roman Catholic prelate who served as Bishop of Sant'Agata de' Goti (1588–1595).

Biography
Giovanni Evangelista Pelleo was ordained a priest in the Order of Friars Minor Conventual.
On 17 October 1588, he was appointed during the papacy of Pope Sixtus V as Bishop of Sant'Agata de' Goti.
He served as Bishop of Sant'Agata de' Goti until his death in 1595.

While bishop, he was the principal co-consecrator of Gaspare Pasquali, Bishop of Ruvo (1589).

References

External links and additional sources
 (for Chronology of Bishops) 
 (for Chronology of Bishops) 

16th-century Italian Roman Catholic bishops
Bishops appointed by Pope Sixtus V
1595 deaths
Conventual Franciscan bishops